Christophe Beghin (born 2 January 1980) is a Belgian retired basketball player and current coach. Born in Schaerbeek, Beghin had a long and successful professional career in which he was elected Belgium's Player of the Year three times.

Beghin holds the record for most games played with the Belgian national team, with 137 played games.

Coaching career
On 18 June 2019, Beghin was announced as Antwerp Giants head coach after Roel Moors left the club. He coached the team for two seasons, winning the Belgian Cup in 2020. On 14 January 2022, Beghin and Antwerp parted ways. 

On 11 March 2022, Beghin signed a two-year contract with Kortrijk Spurs of the Top Division 1.

Career statistics

EuroLeague

|-
| style="text-align:left;"| 2001–02
| style="text-align:left;"| Telindus Oostende
| 14 || 10 || 28.4 || .452 || .000 || .653 || 5.4 || .5 || .9 || .6 || 10.3 || 9.4
|-
| style="text-align:left;"| 2010–11
| style="text-align:left;" rowspan=2 | Spirou Charleroi
| 4 || 0 || 9.6 || .222 || .000 || .500 || 1.3 || .3 || .5 || .0 || 1.3 || –0.8
|-
| style="text-align:left;"| 2011–12
| 9 || 9 || 18.3 || .431 || .333 || .607 || 2.7 || .6 || .0 || .0 || 7.0 || 4.6
|- class="sortbottom"
| style="text-align:center;" colspan=2 | Career
| 27 || 19 || 22.3 || .435 || .222 || .633 || 3.9 || .6 || .5 || .3 || 7.9 || 6.3

References

1980 births
Living people
Antwerp Giants players
BC Oostende players
Belgian basketball coaches
Belgian men's basketball players
Centers (basketball)
People from Schaerbeek
Power forwards (basketball)
RBC Pepinster players
Roseto Sharks players
Spirou Charleroi players
Sportspeople from Brussels